Pseudoceroprepes piratis is a species of snout moth described by Edward Meyrick in 1887.

Distribution
It is known from Australia and Papua New Guinea.

References

Phycitinae
Moths described in 1887